was a Japanese ski jumper who competed in the early 1970s. His best finish was a Silver Medal in the Individual Normal Hill at the 1972 Winter Olympics in Sapporo.

References

External links
 
 

1944 births
2019 deaths
Japanese male ski jumpers
Ski jumpers at the 1968 Winter Olympics
Ski jumpers at the 1972 Winter Olympics
Olympic ski jumpers of Japan
Sportspeople from Sapporo
Olympic medalists in ski jumping
Medalists at the 1972 Winter Olympics
Olympic silver medalists for Japan
20th-century Japanese people
21st-century Japanese people